Botswana competed in the 2003 All-Africa Games held at the National Stadium in the city of Abuja, Nigeria. The team came eleventh overall with eleven medals, nearly half of them in karate.

Competition
Botswana entered twelve events at the games. Although she did not win a medal, Amantle Montsho ran her first race during the games. The award ceremony for the high jump was memorable for featuring an impromptu solo rendition of the national anthem by the winner, Kabelo Mmono. This was swiftly followed by a victory for the men’s 4 x 400 metres relay team, which won with a time of 3:02.24, a national record.

Medal summary
The country won a tally of eleven medals, consisting of four gold, one silver and six bronze. The country ranked eleventh in the medal table.

Medal table

List of Medalists

Gold Medal

Silver Medal

Bronze Medal

See also
Botswana at the African Games

References

2003 in Botswana sport
2003
 Nations at the 2003 All-Africa Games